Oldarhian is the second album by Norwegian black/thrash metal band Sarke. It was released 15 April 2011 via Indie Recordings.

History 
On 18 October 2010, Sarke, this time with a full line-up, entered the studio, always with producer Lars-Erik Westby. On February 2011, it was announced that the new album, titled Oldarhian, would be released on 15 April 2011.

On 19 April, there was the release party in Oslo for Oldarhian, featuring special guests Insidious Disease.

Track listing

Credits 
 Sarke – bass
 Nocturno Culto – vocals
 Asgeir Mickelson – drums
 Cyrus – guitar
 Steinar Gundersen – guitar
 Anders Hunstad – keyboards

Production
 Lars-Erik Westby – producer

References 

Indie Recordings albums
2011 albums
Sarke albums